A list of Spanish-produced and co-produced feature films released in Spain in 2022. When applicable, the domestic theatrical release date is favoured.

The crop was hailed as one of the strongest for Spanish cinema in recent years. Domestic box-office gross for Spanish films roughly doubled 2021 figures up to €82 million, but still remained below pre-pandemic standards.

Films

Box office 
The ten highest-grossing Spanish films in 2022, by domestic box office gross revenue, were as follows:

See also 
 37th Goya Awards
 List of 2022 box office number-one films in Spain

References
Informational notes

Citations

Spanish
2022
Films